The Adrien Pouliot Award is presented annually by the Canadian Mathematical Society.  The award is presented to individuals or teams in recognition of significant contributions to mathematics education in Canada.  The inaugural award was presented in 1995. Persons and teams that are nominated for the award will have their applications considered for a period of three years. The award is named in honor of Canadian mathematician Adrien Pouliot. It should be distinguished with a different but similarly-named award, the Adrien Pouliot Prize of the Mathematical Association of Québec.

Recipients of the Adrien Pouliot Award
Source: Canadian Mathematical Society

See also

 List of mathematics awards

References

External links
 Canadian Mathematical Society

Awards of the Canadian Mathematical Society
Mathematics education awards
Teacher awards
Awards established in 1995